Douglas Legg (30 October 1914 – 30 October 1989) was a British basketball player. He competed in the men's tournament at the 1948 Summer Olympics.

References

External links
 

1914 births
1989 deaths
British men's basketball players
Olympic basketball players of Great Britain
Basketball players at the 1948 Summer Olympics
Sportspeople from Birmingham, West Midlands